Blachman is a 2013 Danish talk show.

Blachman may also refer to:

Thomas Blachman,  Danish jazz musician, composer and show host
Jeremy Blachman (born 1979), American journalist